Bulbophyllum baileyi, commonly known as the fruit fly orchid, is a species of epiphytic or lithophytic orchid that is native to Queensland and New Guinea. It has coarse, creeping rhizomes, curved, yellowish pseudobulbs with a single thick, fleshy leaf, and a single cream-coloured flower with yellow, red or purple spots. It grows on trees and rocks in open forest, often in exposed places.

Description
Bulbophyllum baileyi is an epiphytic or lithophytic herb that forms spreading clumps. The sepals and petals curve inwards. Flowering mainly occurs between October and February.

Taxonomy and naming
Bulbophyllum baileyi was first formally described in 1875 by Ferdinand von Mueller. The description was published in Fragmenta phytographiae Australiae from a specimen collected by Frederick Manson Bailey growing on the trunk of Casuarina equisetifolia near Rockingham Bay. The specific epithet (baileyi) honours Manson Bailey who collected the type specimen.

Distribution and habitat
The fruit fly orchid grows on trees, rocks and cliff faces in mangroves, rainforest and open forest. It is found in New Guinea, some Torres Strait Islands and the Cape York Peninsula as far south as Townsville.

Ecology
The flowers of B. baileyi are pollinated by male fruit flies of the genus Bactrocera which are attracted to them by their "fruity" fragrance. It has been suggested that the flies are seeking zingerone which they use as a sexual attractant. The labellum of the flower is delicately hinged and when the insect lands on it, is tipped into the column and either has sticky pollinia attached to its back or deposits the pollinia on the receptive stigma.

References

External links
 
 View a map of historical sightings of this species at the Australasian Virtual Herbarium
 View observations of this species on iNaturalist
 View images of this species on Flickriver

baileyi
Orchids of Queensland
Orchids of New Guinea
Plants described in 1875
Taxa named by Ferdinand von Mueller